Paul Pattison is an Oscar-winning makeup artist who was a member of the Academy of Television Arts & Sciences. He, along with Lois Burwell and Peter Frampton, won at the 68th Academy Awards in 1995 for Best Makeup for the film Braveheart. Paul won the BAFTA  award for his work on Braveheart in 1996. Also, in 2004 and 2012 he was a nominee for the primetime emmy award because of his work on Ike: Countdown to D-Day and Hemingway & Gellhorn. His work on Hemingway & Gelhorn also won the Online Film & Television Association. Paul won the APDG and AACTA awards for his work on Mad Max: Fury Road and Lambs of God in 2015 and 2019. He is also known for his work on Mad Max: Fury Road, Braveheart, and The Cave.

Media worked on 

 Cash Truck
 The Old Guard
 Hobbs and Shaw
 Hellboy
 The Meg
 Atomic Blonde
 Lion
 Mechanic 2
 Furious 7
 The Expendables 3
 Stonehearst Asylum
 Hummingbird
 Mad Max:Fury Road
 The Expendables 2
 Parker
 Hemingway and Gellhorn
 Singularity
 Killer Elite
 Tomorrow, When the War Began
 Action Replay
 The Waiting City
 Solomon Kane
 Dying Breed
 Blood & Chocolate
 Silent Hill
 The Cave
 Anacondas
 Red Head: Lucy Ball story
 Loves Brother
 The Extreme Team
 Monkey's Mask
 Mission Impossible II
 Dear Walter Dear Claudia
 Mr Nice Guy
 Praise
 The Well
 Doing Time for Pasty Cline
 Dead Heart
 Rapa Nui
 Mission Top Secret
 The Nostradamus Kid
 Body Melt
 Scooby Doo
 Farewell to the King
 Spotswood
 Silver Brumby
 The Light Horseman
 Ground Zero
 Kangaroo
 Beyond Borders
 Wind
 Braveheart
 Lambs of God
 Marco Polo
 Hawke
 Dirt Game
 Tontine Massacre AKA Chichane
 The Company
 IKE Thunder in June
 Blonde: Marilyn Monroe Story
 Farscape
 Noah's Ark
 Moby Dick
 Beverly Hills Family Robinson
 Twisted Tails
 The Flying Doctors
 Mission: Impossible series
 The Far Country
 All The Way

Selected filmography
Scooby-Doo (2002)
Mission: Impossible 2 (2000)
Moby Dick (1998-TV Miniseries)
Braveheart (1995)
Return to Snowy River (1988)

References

External links

Best Makeup Academy Award winners
Living people
Year of birth missing (living people)
Make-up artists